George "Georginho" Lucas Alves de Paula (born May 24, 1996), commonly known as Georginho, is a Brazilian professional basketball player formerly for Sao Paulo of the Novo Basquete Brasil (NBB).

Professional career

Pinheiros (2013–2016)
De Paula made his professional debut with E.C. Pinheiros in Brazil's top-tier level league, the NBB, during the 2013–14 season. On April 21, 2015, de Paula entered the 2015 NBA draft. He then withdrew from the draft, before the draft removal deadline.

Athletico Paulistano (2016–2017)
In 2016, he joined the Brazilian League club Club Athletico Paulistano.

Rio Grande Valley Vipers (2017–2018)
On the April 2017 deadline, de Paula decided to enter his name for the 2017 NBA draft. Two months later, he became one of only 10 international underclassmen to confirm his permanent entry for the NBA Draft that year. Ultimately, he would not be drafted that year, but competed for the Houston Rockets in 2017 NBA Summer League. He would later sign a training camp deal with the Rockets on September 27 that same year. He would later be one of four players released from the team on October 13. Later on that month, de Paula would sign with the Rio Grande Valley Vipers for the rest of the season.

Return to Paulistano (2018–2019)
On June 11, 2018, de Paula returned to Paulistano.

São Paulo FC and Franca (2019–present)
He played two seasons with São Paulo FC and was named to the All-NBB Team both seasons.

National team career

Brazilian junior national team
De Paula played with Brazil’s under-17 national team at the 2013 FIBA South American Under-17 Championship, where he won a bronze medal. He represented his country's under-18 national team, at the 2014 FIBA Americas Under-18 Championship.

Brazilian senior national team
De Paula has been a member of the senior Brazilian national basketball team. With Brazil, he played at the 2017 FIBA AmeriCup.

References

External links
 George de Paula at draftexpress.com
 George de Paula at fiba.com (archive)
 George de Paula at latinbasket.com
 George de Paula at lnb.com.br 
 George de Paula at nbadraft.net

1996 births
Living people
Brazilian expatriate basketball people in the United States
Brazilian men's basketball players
Club Athletico Paulistano basketball players
Esporte Clube Pinheiros basketball players
Point guards
Rio Grande Valley Vipers players
Shooting guards
São Paulo FC basketball players
Franca Basquetebol Clube players
Sportspeople from São Paulo (state)
People from Diadema